Kevin "k-Figg" Figueiredo is an American drummer.

Kevin began playing drums at the age of ten, when his grandfather bought him a drum kit. He has studied with jazz drummer Bob Gullotti "The Fringe" and Mike Mangini, who collectively exposed him to many different approaches to drumming.

He has performed with artists/bands such as: Satellite Party, Dramagods, Population 1, Slash, Nuno Bettencourt, Chester Bennington, Perry Farrell, Lucia Moniz, and Tantric. Kevin has also recorded with Dramagods, Population 1, The Satellite Party, Lucia Moniz, and Extreme.

Extreme
In November 2007, Kevin joined the reuniting band Extreme including original members Gary Cherone, Pat Badger, and Nuno Bettencourt, with whom Kevin performed in both Satellite Party and DramaGods.  Kevin replaces mentor Mike Mangini, who took over drum duties from Extreme's original drummer, Paul Geary, from 1994 to 1996.

Equipment
Kevin endorses DW drums, Evans drumheads, Zildjian cymbals, and Vater drumsticks.

Discography

With Population 1
 Sessions from Room 4 (2004)

With DramaGods
 Love (2005)

With The Satellite Party
 Ultra Payloaded (2007)

With Extreme
 Saudades de Rock (2008)

References

American people of Portuguese descent
American rock drummers
Living people
People from Hudson, Massachusetts
1977 births
20th-century American drummers
American male drummers
21st-century American drummers
20th-century American male musicians
21st-century American male musicians
Satellite Party members
Extreme (band) members